Statistics of Chinese Taipei National Football League in the 1988 season.

Overview
Flying Camel won the championship.

References
RSSSF

1983
1
Taipei
Taipei